Kneipp is a surname. Notable people with the surname include:

Sebastian Kneipp (1821–1897), Bavarian priest and naturopath 
George Kneipp (1922–1993), Australian judge
Joseph Kneipp (born 1973), Australian squash player

See also
Kneipp facility
Kneip
Occupational surnames